The 2018–19 Marshall Thundering Herd women's basketball team represented the Marshall University during the 2018–19 NCAA Division I women's basketball season. The Thundering Herd, led by second year head coach Tony Kemper, played their home games at the Cam Henderson Center and were members of Conference USA. They finished the season 17–15, 10–6 in C-USA play to finish in a tie for fifth place. They lost in the first round of the C-USA women's tournament to UTEP. They received an invitation to the WBI where they defeated Davidson in the first round before losing to Appalachian State in the quarterfinals.

Roster

Schedule

|-
!colspan=9 style=| Non-conference regular season

|-
!colspan=9 style=| Conference USA regular season

|-
!colspan=9 style=| Conference USA Women's Tournament

|-
!colspan=9 style=| WBI

See also
2018–19 Marshall Thundering Herd men's basketball team

References

Marshall Thundering Herd women's basketball seasons
Marshall
Marsh
Marsh
Marshall